African-American bookstores, also known as black bookstores, are bookstores owned and operated by African Americans.  These stores often, although not always, specialize in works by and about African Americans and their target customers are often African Americans.  Although they are a variety of African-American business, African-American bookstores have often been closely tied to radical political movements including Marxism, Black Power, and pan-Africanism. The first documented African-American bookstore was established by the abolitionist David Ruggles in 1834. The first African-American bookstore to open in Harlem was Young's Book Exchange. One of the earliest African-American bookstores to achieve national prominence was Lewis Michaux's African National Memorial Bookstore, which operated in Harlem from the early 1930s to the middle of the 1970s.  Michaux's store doubled as a meeting place for black activists, including most famously Malcolm X.  The Black Power movement embraced black-owned bookstores in the 1960s and 70s as vehicles for promoting their ideology and creating radical political spaces in black communities across the United States.  By the 1990s, African-American bookstores earned significant attention from more politically moderate and business oriented media outlets such as the magazine Black Enterprise.  In the 2000s and 2010s, however, as independent bookstores of all kinds declined and bookstores chains and Amazon increasingly sold black-authored books, the number of African-American bookstores declined rapidly, dropping from more than 250 to just over 70.

Prominent black-owned booksellers currently in business include Marcus Books in Oakland, the oldest black bookseller in the country, Everyone's Place in Baltimore, Hakim's Bookstore in Philadelphia, Eso Won Books in Los Angeles (noted as "a Leimert Park institution of black literature and culture"), and Sankofa in Washington, D.C.

Prominent online black booksellers include AALBC.com (founded in 1998), Mahogany Books and Hue-Man Bookstore, which formerly had brick-and-mortar storefronts in Denver, Colorado, and in Harlem.

See also
 Bookselling in the US
 Antiquarian book trade in the United States
 Books in the United States
 Lewis H. Micheaux
 Young's Book Exchange
 Martin Sostre
 David Ruggles

References

 Book
 African-American